Jacobus Swart (* February 9, 1950 in Heiloo, The Netherlands) is a professor at State University of Campinas - UNICAMP, Campinas, Brazil and was named Fellow of the Institute of Electrical and Electronics Engineers (IEEE) in 2014 for contributions to microelectronics education in Brazil.

Biography 
Jacobus Swart got his Engineer Degree and a Doctor in Engineering from Polytechnic School of the University of São Paulo, USP, 
in 1975 and 1981 respectively.
Afterwards he did a postdoc at Catholic University of Leuven, Leuven, Belgium.
Later-on he was a visiting researcher for some time at Research Triangle Institute, NC;
at Cornell University, NY;
at Institute of Mobile and Satellite Communication Techniques in Germany
and University of Bordeaux in France.
He was an academic member of the Polytechnic School of the University of São Paulo
before he joined FEE UNICAMP 
in 1988 where he became full professor in 1997.
He acted also as director of the Center for Semiconductors at UNICAMP
and also of a national research center named CTI Renato Archer in Campinas.
From 2013 until 2020 he served as representative of IMEC from Belgium in Brazil.

Accomplishments 

Jacobus Swart authored and co-authored so far 76 journal papers and 220 articles in conference proceedings.
He is author of an engineering teaching book entitled Semicondutores: Fundamentos, técnicas e aplicações.
He gave numerous invited talks and participated in round table discussions, summum up 190 times.
He is a Distinguished Lecturer of the Institute of Electrical and Electronics Engineers.
His research topics include silicon and compound semiconductor technologies, device modeling and circuit design.
He supervised over 60 thesis and dissertations at USP and University of Campinas (Unicamp).

Awards
 2020: EDS/IEEE Distinguished Service Award 2020 
 2014: IEEE Fellow 
 2014: Full Member of National Engineering Academy 
 2012: Full Member of Science Academy of the State of São Paulo 
 2010: Pe Roberto Landell de Moura Award by Brazilian Microelectronics Societey – SBMicro
 1992: Research Fellowship by CNPq, with highest level 1A since 2003

References

Fellow Members of the IEEE
Living people
Year of birth missing (living people)